Bail is the conditional release of an arrested person prior to their trial, or the money or property used as security that the person will appear at trial.

Bail may also refer to:

People
 Alex Bail (1900–1973), American radical and union leader
 Charles Bail, director and co-screenwriter of the 1976 comedy film The Gumball Rally
 Grace Shattuck Bail (1898–1996), American composer, poet and teacher
 Murray Bail (born 1941), Australian writer of novels, short stories and non-fiction
 Paul Bail (born 1965), English cricketer
 René Bail (1931–2007), Canadian director, cinematographer and actor
 Rohan Bail (born 1988), Australian rules footballer

Objects
 Bail (cricket), one of the two wooden crosspieces that rest on top of the stumps to form a wicket in cricket
 Bail (jewelry), a component of certain types of jewelry, mostly necklaces
 Bail handle or bail, a hooped handle of a bucket or kettle
 Bail or flip-top closure on jars or bottles

Other uses
 Bail Organa, a Star Wars character
 Bail, an animal stall for milking cows

See also 
 Baal (disambiguation)
 Bael (disambiguation)
 Bale (disambiguation)
 Clovis Le Bail (born 1995), French rugby union player
 Bailing (disambiguation)
 Bailout (disambiguation)